Acrogenotheca is a genus of fungi in the class Dothideomycetes. The relationship of this taxon to other taxa within the class is unknown (incertae sedis).

Species 
 Acrogenotheca elegans
 Acrogenotheca ornata
 Acrogenotheca pulcherrima

See also 
 List of Dothideomycetes genera incertae sedis

References

External links 
 Index Fungorum

Dothideomycetes enigmatic taxa
Dothideomycetes genera